Só Risos it is a Brazilian television program that the program had its exhibition in 2017 by Rede Bandeirantes.

References 

Rede Bandeirantes original programming
2017 Brazilian television series debuts
2010s Brazilian television series